The discography of Mucc includes 16 studio albums, three live albums, four extended plays, 45 singles, 15 demos and 29 video albums. They are a Japanese visual kei rock band, formed in Ibaraki Prefecture in 1997. When original bassist Hiro left in 1999, the classic line up of Tatsuro on vocals, Miya on guitar, Yukke on bass, and Satochi on drums was solidified. Antique, their debut EP, was released in 1999 by  Misshitsu Neurose, an independent record label formed by Cali Gari guitarist Ao Sakurai. Mucc signed to Danger Crue Records and established their own sublabel, Shu, for the 2002 release of their second album, Hōmura Uta. The band made their major label debut on Universal with Zekū the following year. In 2009, they returned to being an indie band on Danger Crue, before signing to Sony for 2012's Shangri-La. With the end of 2017, Mucc returned to being an independent band on Danger Crue yet again. After 24 years, Satochi retired from the music business in October 2021, leaving Mucc a trio.

Studio albums

Extended plays

Live albums

Other live albums

Self-cover albums

Compilation albums

Singles

Other singles

V/A Compilations

Videos 
 
 
 
 
 
 
 The Clips -Track of Six Nine- (August 5, 2009)
 
 
 
 Mucc Chemical Parade (November 23, 2011)
 
 
 
 
 Mucc Tour 2012-2013 "Shangri-La" (October 2, 2013)
 
 F#ck the Past F#ck the Future on World -Paradise from T.R.E.N.D.Y.- (November 25, 2015)
 Maverick DC Presents Double Headline Tour 2016「M.A.D」 (November 23, 2016)
 The Clips II ~Track of Six Nine~ (October 4, 2017)
 
 
 
 From the Mothership/From the Underground (May 4, 2021)
 
 
 
 Crossroad of the Brightness World (February 2, 2022)

Demos 
 "No!?" (October 1997)
 
 
 
 
 
 
 
 
 
 
 
 "Hotel Lemmon Tree Demo" (July 1, 2019)
 "Room Demo" (August 27, 2019)
 "Cobalt Demo" (November 10, 2019)

References

External links
Mucc's discography at their official website
 Mucc's discography at Danger Crue

Discographies of Japanese artists
Heavy metal group discographies